Oscar Ringdahl  (1885–1966)  was a Swedish entomologist who specialised in Diptera and Trichoptera.

Ringdahl described many new species from Sweden and Lappland.
Parts of his personal collection are in the Swedish Museum of Natural History and Lund University Zoology Museum (Lunds Universitet Zoologiska museet), Lund.

Works
Partial list::
Ringdahl, O. (1939) Diptera der Fam. Muscidae, (die Gattungen Aricia und Anthomyza) von Zetterstedt in “Insecta Lapponica” und “Diptera Scandinaviae” beschrieben. Opuscula entomologica, 4, 137–159.
Ringdahl, O. (1952) Catalogus Insectorum Sueciae. XI. Diptera Cyclorrhapha: Muscaria Schizometopa. Opuscula entomologica 17: 129–186
Ringdahl, O. with Peder Nielsen and Søren Ludvig Tuxen (1954) Zoology of Iceland. Vol III. Part 48a. Diptera. Copenhagen and Reykjavik: Ejnar Munksgaard,
Ringdahl, O. (1954) Svensk Insektfauna, 11, Diptera, Cyclorapha Schizophora Schizometopa, I. Fam. Muscidae (Häfte 1): 91.
Ringdahl, O. (1956) Svensk insektfauna: Muscidae, Stockholm. Entomologiska Foreningen., 1: 1–334.

References
Hugo Andersson, 1978 Scandinavian entomologists 4 - Oscar Ringdahl Insect Systematics & Evolution, Volume 9, Issue 3, pages 178–187 1978   E-

External links

1885 births
1966 deaths
Dipterists
Swedish entomologists
20th-century Swedish zoologists